Franz Dörr (10 February 1913 – 13 October 1972) was a German Luftwaffe military aviator and fighter ace during World War II. He is credited with 128 aerial victories achieved in 437 combat missions, becoming an "ace-in-a-day" on nine separate occasions. All of his aerial victories were claimed on the Eastern Front.

Born in Mannheim, Dörr grew up in the Weimar Republic and Nazi Germany. Following flight training, he served as a reconnaissance pilot in the Invasion of Poland and Battle of France. In late 1941, he served with Jagdgeschwader 5 (JG 5—5th Fighter Wing) which was moved near the Arctic Ocean in the northern sector of the Eastern Front. He claimed his first aerial victory on 9 May 1942. In September 1943, Dörr was appointed squadron leader of 7. Staffel (7th squadron) of JG 5 and in August 1944, he was given command of III. Gruppe (3rd group) of JG 5. Dörr was awarded the Knight's Cross of the Iron Cross on  19 August 1944 after 95 aerial victories claimed. Following the loss of the German battleship Tirpitz on 12 November 1944, Dörr was court-martialled but was acquitted from all charges. He died on 13 October 1972 in Konstanz.

Biography
Dörr was born on 10 February 1913 in Mannheim, at the time in the Grand Duchy of Baden of the German Empire. During Invasion of Poland and Battle of France, Dörr served as a reconnaissance pilot. In spring 1941, he was transferred to 1.(Erg.)/Jagdgeschwader 3 (JG 3—3rd Fighter Wing), based in the Netherlands. The Ergänzungsjagdgruppe, a replacement training group, had been formed in April 1941 at Kraków. The unit was formed with two squadrons and commanded by Major Alfred Müller. In July, the Ergänzungsjagdgruppe was ordered to the Netherlands, escorting German shipping. In late August, the unit was ordered to an airfield near Esbjerg, Denmark. In addition to its training role, its mission was to provide air defense for Jutland's western coast. To achieve this, a Schwarm, a flight of four to six aircraft, from 1. Staffel (1st squadron), under the command of Dörr, was based at a forward airfield at Rømø.

War on the Arctic Front
On 29 December 1941, Ergänzungsjagdgruppe 3 received the order from the Oberkommando der Luftwaffe (OKL) that it would be detached from JG 3 on 31 December and was renamed to 7. Staffel (7th squadron) of Jagdgeschwader 5 (JG 5—5th Fighter Wing) and subordinated as an autonomous Staffel to Jagdfliegerführer Norwegen. On 24 April, 7. Staffel arrived in Pechenga, also referred to as Petsamo, where it was subordinated to III. Gruppe (3rd group) of JG 5 under the command of Hauptmann (Captain) Günther Scholz. On 9 May 1942, 7. Staffel took at 18:00 to patrol the front along the Zapadnaya Litsa River. In this engagement, the Germans claimed two Hurricanes shot down, including one by Dörr. According to Soviet records, only one Hurricane was lost, its pilot Senior Lieutenant Lewtschuk from 197 IAP (197th Fighter Aviation Regiment—Istrebitelny Aviatsionny Polk) bailed out. On 19 July, Dörr participated on a fighter escort mission for seven Junkers Ju 87 dive bombers and five Junkers Ju 88 bombers attacking Murmansk. The flight was intercepted by Yakovlev Yak-1 fighters from 20 IAP (20th Fighter Aviation Regiment). These were the first Yak-1 fighters to appear in this theatre of operations. In the resulting aerial combat, Dörr claimed one of the fighters shot down, which he had identified as a Curtiss P-40 Warhawk.

On 12 July 1943, Dörr lost his Messerschmitt Bf 109 G-2 (Werknummer 13600—factory number) over sea, officially due to engine trouble. Mombeek speculates that in fact the aircraft was lost in a mid-air collision with another Bf 109 G-2 piloted by Unteroffizier Richard Steinbach.

Squadron leader
Dörr claimed his 20th victory on 18 August 1943. He was appointed Staffelkapitän (squadron leader) of 7. Staffel of JG 5 on 1 September 1943. Dörr succeeded Oberleutnant Theodor Weissenberger in this position who was given command of 6. Staffel. JG 5 flew multiple missions from Pechenga and Kirkenes in protection of a German convoy on 14 September. At 17:03, a Rotte of Bf 109 G-2s sighted and reported an enemy formation consisting of Douglas A-20 Havoc, also known as Boston bombers, Ilyushin Il-2 ground attack aircraft, as well as Bell P-39 Airacobra and Hurricane fighters. At 18:15, 9. Staffel was scrambled at Pechenga and 5. Staffel at Svartnes. A bit later further Bf 109s from 4., 7. and 5. Staffel took off. The Germans intercepted the Soviet formation east of Ekkerøy over the Varangerfjord. In this aerial engagement, Dörr claimed the destruction of two Il-2s and one P-40 fighter.

On 25 November, following ten days of relative quiet, the Soviet Air Forces conducted a coordinated attack on Titovka, and the airfields Høybuktmoen at Kirkenes and Luostari near Pechenga. Titovka was attacked by sixteen Il-2s and six P-40s, escorted by six Yak-1 and four Yakovlev Yak-9 fighters. Høybuktmoen was hit by twelve Petlyakov Pe-2 escorted by twelve P-39s and six Yak-9. The Luostari airfield was struck by sixteen Il-2 and six P-40, protected by fourteen Yak-1 and six Hurricanes. That day, Dörr claimed a P-40 and an Il-2 ground attack aircraft, taking his total to 31 aerial victories. He was awarded the German Cross in Gold on 20 March 1944.

Flying out of Pechenga on 2 April 1944, Dörr claimed two Yak-9 fighters shot down. These were his 32nd and 33rd aerial victories. Parts of III. Gruppe were ordered to relocate from Pechenga to Svartnes at 17:17 on 25 May 1944. At 21:00, 19 Bf 109s under the leadership of Gruppenkommandeur (Group Commander) Major (Major) Heinrich Ehrler were scrambled from Svartnes to fend off approximately 80 Soviet aircraft attacking a German convoy. During this encounter, III. Gruppe claimed 33 aerial victories, including twenty "Boston" bombers, eight P-40s and five P-39s. However, Soviet records only account for five losses that day. Dörr claimed four aerial victories in this aerial combat. The next day, Ehrler again led 19 Bf 109s from III. Gruppe in defense of the German convoy. This time the Germans reported combat with approximately 100 Soviet aircraft and claimed 40 aerial victories, among them five by Dörr. Again, Soviet records do not match this figure, they document the loss of nine aircraft.

On 1 June 1944, 9. Staffel was officially detached from III. Gruppe and subordinated to II. Gruppe which had left Finland in April 1944 and fought in Reichsverteidigung (Defense of the Reich). Not every pilot of 9. Staffel was impacted by this order. Some pilots stayed in Pechenga and formed a newly created Kommandostaffel (commando squadron), later renamed to Eismeerstaffel (Artic Sea squadron).

Group commander
On 1 August, Geschwaderkommodore (Wing Commander) of JG 5, Oberstleutnant Scholz was given the position of Jagdfliegerführer Norwegen. In consequence of this decision, Major Ehrler was appointed the new Geschwaderkommodore and Dörr replaced Ehrler as Gruppenkommandeur of III. Gruppe while Leutnant Walter Schuck was given command of 7. Staffel, redesignated to 10. Staffel on 6 August 1944.

On 17 August, eight P-40 fighter aircraft of the 6 IAD (Istrebitel'naya Aviatsionnaya Diviziya—Fighter Aviation Division), accompanied by fourteen P-39 fighter aircraft, attacked the Luostari/Pechenga airfield. In parallel, further Soviet aircraft, including a number of Boston bombers, attacked the harbor at Kirkenes. First elements of III. Gruppe were scambled at 09:25, resulting in various aerial encounters. In this combat, Dörr claimed three victories. Two days later, Dörr was awarded the Knight's Cross of the Iron Cross for 95 aerial victories and promoted to Hauptmann. The presentation of the Knight's Cross was made by Geschwaderkommodore Ehrler. He claimed six further aircraft shot down on 23 August 1944, among them his 100th victory, taking his total to 106 aerial victories. He was the 88th Luftwaffe pilot to achieve the century mark.

In October 1944, Dörr claimed to have shot down 22 Russian aircraft, including six on 9 October and five on 21 October. On 9 October, the XIX. Gebirgs-Armeekorps was on the retreat and threatened by encirclement from Soviet forces that breached the German defenses south of the Petsamo (Pechenga) airfield during the Petsamo–Kirkenes Offensive. That day, Dörr led III. Gruppe and claimed six aerial victories.

Sinking of the Tirpitz
On 12 November 1944 the RAF sank the battleship Tirpitz. Avro Lancaster bombers from No. 617 and No. 9 squadrons were sent to Håkøya, a little west of Tromsø, where the Tirpitz was based. At the time, JG 5 was based at the Bardufoss airfield with 12 operational Focke-Wulf Fw 190 A-3s. Neither Dörr nor his Geschwaderkommodore Ehrler knew the exact location of the battleship and were told she was based near Tromsø. At no time was the Geschwaderkommodore informed his unit's sole responsibility was the protection of the ship.

The command and control center at Bardufoss was informed shortly before 08:00 that three Lancasters had been sighted at 07:39 in the vicinity of Mosjøen heading east. Shortly later, a second bulletin informed that a further Lancaster was sighted heading northeast. The reason for this delay in communication was that the message had been routed from Mosjøen to Fauske and then to the Luftwaffe headquarters at Narvik. The communication officer in charge, Leutnant Leo Beniers, immediately forwarded this information to Tromsø. At 08:18 the Luftwaffe fighter control center was informed which issued an air alarm for the area of Bodø. At 08:34 further four Lancasters were reported but plotted in the wrong Planquadrat (PQ—grid reference) of the Luftwaffe grid map. Due to this error, neither Ehrler nor Dörr were informed of the approaching bombers.

That day, Ehrler had preemptively ordered 9. Staffel of JG 5 at Bardufoss airfield on three-minute readiness while the Kommandostaffel was still undergoing training and had been placed on 15-minute readiness. Ehrler, who had planned to fly to Alta, entered his command post at 08:50, unaware of the unfolding events. As he was just about to leave the command post, Tirpitz signaled that they heard aircraft engine noise of unknown origin and altitude, Tirpitz did not report approaching enemy bombers. At 09:18, Ehrler ordered cockpit readiness for 9. Staffel and placed the Kommandostaffel on three-minute readiness. The situation remained unclear for Ehrler until 09:21–09:23 when a second aircraft noise message arrived. He then at 09:23 sounded the alarm and scrambled 9. Staffel. In parallel, Dörr who was alarmed by the fighters taking off, arrived at the command post and took charge of the Kommandostaffel. Ehrler was airborne at 09:25 while takeoff of 9. Staffel was delayed by five minutes due to a landing Junkers Ju 52. Adding to the confusion, when the British aircraft were detected by the German air defence staff at Tromsø, they asked the airfield command if any fighter aircraft were ready for takeoff. The question was affirmed, but the JG 5 staff thought the enquiry concerned the flight to Alta. The naval officers on board Tirpitz were notified Erhler was airborne before the British began their attack at 09:38. Dörr, who was in the command post and waited until further information became available, led the Kommandostaffel and took off at 09:36 heading for Tromsø. This aircraft may have been a Soviet Supermarine Spitfire aerial reconnaissance aircraft.

When it finally became clear that the target was the Tirpitz, it was too late for the fighters to intercept, and the Tirpitz was destroyed with much loss of life. Neither 9. Staffel nor the Kommandostaffel found the bombers and returned to Bardufoss airfield. Dörr and Ehrler were both made responsible for the loss and tried before the Reichskriegsgericht on 17, 18 and 20 December 1944. While Ehrler was found guilty, Dörr was acquitted from all charges. He died on 13 October 1972 in Konstanz, West Germany.

Summary of career

Aerial victory claims
According to US historian David T. Zabecki, Dörr was credited with 128 aerial victories. Obermaier and Spick also list Dörr with 128 victories claimed in 437 combat missions. Mathews and Foreman, authors of Luftwaffe Aces — Biographies and Victory Claims, researched the German Federal Archives and found records for 122 aerial victory claims, all of which claimed on the Eastern Front.

Awards
 Honour Goblet of the Luftwaffe on 28 February 1944 as Leutnant and pilot
 German Cross in Gold on 20 March 1944 as Leutnant in the 7./Jagdgeschwader 5
 Knight's Cross of the Iron Cross on 19 August 1944 as Hauptmann and Gruppenkommandeur of the III./Jagdgeschwader 5

Notes

References

Citations

Bibliography

 
 
 
 
 
 
 
 
 
 
 
 
 
 
 
 
 
 
 
 
 

1913 births
1974 deaths
Luftwaffe pilots
German World War II flying aces
Recipients of the Gold German Cross
Recipients of the Knight's Cross of the Iron Cross
Luftwaffe personnel who were court-martialed
Military personnel from Mannheim